Rosimar Amâncio (born 2 July 1984), better known as Bill, is a Brazilian footballer who plays for Lamphun Warriors in the Thai League 1 as a striker.

Career
Bill began his career on Bragantino, and was loaned to China League One club Nanchang Hengyuan, in 2008.

After the loan, Bill returned to Brazil, and moved to Corinthians, in July 2009. However, due to a lack of first team football, he was loaned to Coritiba.

He then returned to Corinthians, but after another unsuccessful period at the club, he signed a two-year contract with Santos.

Career statistics
(Correct )

Honours
Coritiba
 Campeonato Paranaense (2): 2010, 2011

Santos
 Recopa Sudamericana (1): 2012

Chiangrai United
Thai League 1 (1): 2019
 Thai FA Cup (2): 2018, 2020–21
 Thai League Cup (1): 2018
Thailand Champions Cup (1): 2020

References

External links
 
 
Thaileague Official Website: Lamphun Warriors F.C. Players

1984 births
Living people
People from Campo Grande
Brazilian footballers
Campeonato Brasileiro Série A players
Clube Atlético Bragantino players
Sport Club Corinthians Paulista players
Coritiba Foot Ball Club players
Santos FC players
Shanghai Shenxin F.C. players
Ittihad FC players
Ceará Sporting Club players
Botafogo de Futebol e Regatas players
Busan IPark players
Ratchaburi Mitr Phol F.C. players
Chiangrai United F.C. players
K League 1 players
China League One players
Thai League 1 players
Expatriate footballers in China
Expatriate footballers in Saudi Arabia
Expatriate footballers in South Korea
Expatriate footballers in Thailand
Brazilian expatriate footballers
Brazilian expatriate sportspeople in China
Brazilian expatriate sportspeople in Saudi Arabia
Brazilian expatriate sportspeople in South Korea
Brazilian expatriate sportspeople in Thailand
Saudi Professional League players
Association football forwards
Sportspeople from Mato Grosso do Sul